Gabriela is a 1942 Czech drama film directed by Miroslav Josef Krnanský and starring Marie Glázrová, Karel Höger and Vladimír Leraus.

It was made in  Prague during the German occupation of Czechoslovakia. The film's sets were designed by the art director Alois Mecera.

Cast
 Marie Glázrová as Gabriela Tuzarová  
 Karel Höger as Petr Tuzar  
 Vladimír Leraus as Stepán Tuzar  
 Zdeňka Baldová as Zofka  
 Jirí Steimar as Michal  
 Marie Rosulková as Irena Seborová 
 Jindřich Plachta as Kudrna  
 Vladimír Salač as Jindrísek  
 Theodor as Palous  
 Josef Gruss as Carda  
 František Filipovský as Frantisek Kalista  
 Ada Dohnal as Auditor  
 Bohus Záhorský as Auditor  
 F. X. Mlejnek as Postman 
 Alois Dvorský as Machine-man  
 Karel Kolár as Matousek  
 Karel Máj as Marek  
 Frantisek Lasek as Coffee House Guest  
 Milos Subrt as Coffee House Guest  
 Slávka Rosenbergová as Coffee House Guest  
 Emanuel Kovarík as Pilferer  
 Antonín Jirsa as Porter  
 Vladimír Stros as Receptionist  
 Frantisek Paul as Watchman  
 Svetla Svozilová as Annoying Woman  
 Ada Karlovský as Party Guest  
 Bohumil Langer as Party Guest  
 Jaroslav Hladík as Party Guest 
 Josef Dvorský as Party Guest  
 Jirina Hladikova as Party Guest 
 Hugo Huska as Party Guest  
 Ema Kubalova as Party Guest 
 Milena Velísková as Concert Listener

References

Bibliography 
 Bohuslav Hoffmann. Vladimír Neff.  Československý spisovatel, 1982.

External links 
 

1942 films
Czech drama films
1942 drama films
1940s Czech-language films
Films directed by Miroslav Josef Krnanský
Czechoslovak drama films
Czech black-and-white films
1940s Czech films